I Gotta Right to Swing is a 1960 studio album by Sammy Davis Jr., accompanied by an uncredited Count Basie Orchestra, minus Count Basie himself.

Reception

The Allmusic review by Nick Dedina awarded the album four stars and said that the album "is an invigorating mix of up-tempo swing and hard-hitting rhythm & blues...a must-have for fans of classic pop and vocal jazz".

Track listing
 "The Lady Is a Tramp" (Richard Rodgers, Lorenz Hart) - 4:23
 "I Gotta Right to Sing the Blues" (Harold Arlen, Ted Koehler) - 3:04
 "Get On the Right Track Baby" (Titus Turner, Ray Charles) - 2:46
 "Do Nothin' Till You Hear From Me" (Duke Ellington, Bob Russell) - 3:19
 "I Got a Woman" (Charles, Renald Richard) - 4:30
 "There Is No Greater Love" (Isham Jones, Marty Symes) - 2:37
 "Gee, Baby, Ain't I Good to You" (Andy Razaf, Don Redman) - 3:51
 "This Little Girl of Mine" (Charles) - 2:01
 "Till Then" (Eddie Seiler, Sol Marcus, Guy Wood) - 3:23
 "Face to Face" (Bob Ralske, Ben Weisman) - 3:06
 "Mess Around" (Ahmet Ertegün) - 2:49

Personnel
Sammy Davis Jr. - vocals
George Rhodes - piano
Sy Oliver, Jack Pleis, Morty Stevens - arranger, conductor
The Count Basie Orchestra:
John Anderson, Ernie Royal, Snooky Young, Thad Jones, Joe Newman - trumpet
Benny Powell, Al Grey, Henry Coker, Henderson Chambers - trombone
Marshall Royal, Frank Wess, Eric Dolphy - alto saxophone
Frank Foster, Billy Mitchell - tenor saxophone
Charlie Fowlkes - baritone saxophone
Freddie Green - guitar
Ed Jones - double bass
Sonny Payne - drums
Personnel as listed in the liner notes.

References

1960 albums
Albums arranged by Sy Oliver
Albums conducted by Sy Oliver
Count Basie Orchestra albums
Decca Records albums
Sammy Davis Jr. albums